Joanne Frost (born 27 June 1970) is an English television personality, nanny, and author. She is best known for the reality television programme Supernanny UK, in which she was the central figure. The show first aired in the United Kingdom in 2004 and she has branched off into several other reality shows in the United Kingdom, United States and the Netherlands. Family S.O.S. with Jo Frost addressed issues such as addiction and abuse. Family Matters is a talk show. She has written six books on child care.

Early life
Joanne Frost was born on 27 June 1970. She grew up with one brother in Southwest London. Her father was an English builder and her mother, born in Gibraltar, was an interior decorator. Frost had a happy, physically active childhood. Because her father was interested in history, she frequently visited a number of castles and museums as a child. Frost's mother died of breast cancer when Frost was 24.

Career

Nanny
Frost worked as a nanny for over 30 years, beginning in 1989, when she was 18 years of age. She was employed in the United Kingdom and the United States and Frost's clients included celebrities such as John Lloyd, a television producer.

Television

Frost was hired for the Channel 4's Supernanny television show that launched in the United Kingdom in 2004. In each episode she visited a family and implemented consistent disciplinary, behavioral, and entertainment techniques to improve troubled families' lives. In their book Handbook of Psychological Assessment, Case Conceptualization, and Treatment, Children and Adolescents, Michel Hersen and David Reitman state, "With considerable skill, Super Nanny Jo Frost implements standard, evidence-based contingency management procedures, as well as heavy evidence of creating alternative positive activity structures." The show has had its critics, and not all child-care experts agree with her approach. Some people find that the children's right to privacy has been violated and that children are embarrassed when put on the "naughty step". Newcastle University media and cultural-studies lecturer Tracey Jensen believes that the format results in the mother being "shamed before she is transformed".

The show, viewed by six million people in its first year, was an "instant success." Shows were created in 48 countries by 2014 that were tailored after Supernanny. The UK show ran six seasons. The United States version aired on ABC. Like the UK version, the American Supernanny was also a success and garnered Frost invitations to Late Show with David Letterman, The Oprah Winfrey Show, and The Tonight Show with Jay Leno. In 2011, Frost quit Supernanny, and Deborah Tillman, who ran a group of play schools, was hired as her replacement for the United States show.

Jo Frost: Extreme Parental Guidance aired in the UK for Channel 4 beginning in 2010. It had an issue-based format, with limited home visits. Family S.O.S. with Jo Frost premiered 28 May 2013, on TLC in the United States with a 90-minute episode. Supernanny focused on discipline issues, but Family S.O.S. tackled serious, complex issues, such as blended families, addiction, abuse, and marital problems in family's homes. TV critic Hank Stuever commented, "For all its noise and uncomfy moments, Family S.O.S. is relatively genuine stuff, especially for the current incarnation of TLC. Viewers who know Frost's previous work will have no trouble believing that she cares about the outcome and sincerely wants to help these families patch things up." Frost was one of the executive producers for the show.

Beginning 18 April 2014, she hosted the talk show Family Matters for ITV. Prior to the show, families underwent taped interviews about the nature of their difficulties, to be addressed during the talk show. The show relied on Frost's intuition and experience to resolve difficult situations, sometimes dealing with parents more directly than she may have done in other shows. Over time, Frost has softened her image, including stopping her common gesture of pointing her finger at people, and stopped wearing severe suits, both of which had been iconic during her time on Supernanny. Twofour Broadcast planned in July 2014 for a new UK show with Frost that would "help to restore harmony and balance to their family life" over the course of a family retreat.

It was announced in January 2015 that Frost's production company, Nanny Jo Productions, partnered with Strix Television to produce Nanny on Tour. Based in the Netherlands, Frost will travel across the country helping families. An American version debuted on Up TV on 28 January 2016 for a 10-week run.

Lifetime announced, on 27 March 2019, that a twenty-episode season of Supernanny would return on their network. It premiered on 1 January 2020, eight years after the ABC version finished.

On 16 September 2020, Nine Network announced Frost would front their new show The Parent Jury in Australia.

Advocacy
Frost is an advocate for the United Nations Foundation's Shot@Life movement, which aims to decrease vaccine-preventable childhood diseases and deaths. In March 2015, she visited legislators at Capitol Hill to show her support for the movement. Frost operates a blog to promote vaccination of children and is one of the celebrities that has shown her support for #Givingtuesday, the International Day of Giving.

Personal life
In 1994, her mother died of cancer. Frost, who regularly travels for work, lived with her father when she was not taping or meeting other career obligations. As of 2014, she is living with her husband, location coordinator Darrin Jackson, in Orange County, California.

She speaks on parental and familial issues. Frost also is an active supporter for those who live with anaphylaxis and life-threatening allergies, and is the 2014 ambassador for FARE (Food, Allergy, Research and Education) and an activist for children of neglect and poverty.

Works

Programmes
  
  
 
 
 
 
 
 
 The Parent Jury. Australia. 2021

Books

See also
Sharon Carr – Britain's youngest female murderer, whom Frost has presented documentaries on

References

External links

 
 
 Supernanny: The official website of the TV show on ABC
 Supernanny: The official website of the TV show on Style Network

1970 births
Living people
British people of Gibraltarian descent
Participants in American reality television series
Television personalities from London
Nannies
English domestic workers
English expatriates in the United States
21st-century English women writers
Women television personalities